The Surgeon General's Exemplary Service Medal is an award of the US Public Health Service. Administered by the Office of the Surgeon General, the medal is awarded at the sole discretion of the Surgeon General of the United States.

Criteria
The Surgeon General's Exemplary Service Medal is awarded for exemplary contributions the initiatives of the Surgeon General by members of the Uniformed Services of the United States. This award is administered by the Office of the Surgeon General. Unlike most awards, there are no specific nomination criteria or procedures since the medal is awarded at the sole discretion of the Surgeon General.

References 

Awards and decorations of the United States Public Health Service